The slaty-breasted rail (Lewinia striata) is a rail species native to the Indian Subcontinent and Southeast Asia. Breeding has been recorded in July near Dehradun in the foothills of the Indian Himalayas. Despite traditionally being considered part of Gallirallus, recent genetic studies have consistently placed it in the genus Lewinia, which is now formally recognised by the IUCN and IOC.

Gallery

References

slaty-breasted rail
Birds of South Asia
Birds of South China
Birds of Southeast Asia
slaty-breasted rail
slaty-breasted rail